Pansipit may refer to:

Pansipit River, Philippines
Pansipit (barangay) in Agoncillo, Batangas, Philippines